is a Japanese visual novel, the fourth installment developed and published by Lump of Sugar. The trial edition was released on April 2, 2010, and the limited edition was released on May 28, 2010. The characters featured in Prism Rhythm were designed by Natuki Tanihara and Yau Sesena. A four-panel manga titled Lamp of Comic: Prism Rhythm has been published, and a novel of Prism Rhythm was written by Ricotta and then publicized on August 31, 2010.

Characters

Kazuki is the player character of Prism Rhythm. He is inspired to enroll in a reputable school after seeing Caroline Marigold's amazing dance skills.

Elsterrier is Caroline's younger sister and a classmate of Kazuki's in St.Beltina Academy. She is an unusually hard worker and is quite clever.

Kasumi is Kazuki's busty cousin, she is an upperclassman.

Ria is another classmate of Kazuki who works in the library named Azrael. She likes to spread and create rumors.

Gin is a girl with a very small stature who enjoys eating food a great deal.

 

 Elsterrier's older sister.

 Stitch
 A green-haired maid.

 Babii 
 An owl-like creature with a ponytail.

 Kyouji Asakwa
 A guy with red hair.

 Yunaha Christie
 A purple-haired girl.

Media

Printed media
On August 31, 2010, a novel based on Prism Rhythm was published by Paradigm. The story was written by RICOTTA.

A four-panel comic strip manga of Prism Rhythm called Lamp of Comic: Prism Rhythm has been published, with a total of five pages. Each page focuses on the protagonist Kazuki interacting with a different heroine, Elsterrier, Kasumi, Lia, Gin and Caroline.

Audio CDs
The opening theme to Prism Rhythm is 'Pure My Voices' sung by Ave; new. The ending song to Elsterrier's route is 'Prism' sung by Matsutade Mio, Lia's ending song is 'Present' sung by Fujimori Yukina, Kasumi's ending song is 'Dreams' sung by Urakasumi Shino, and Gin's ending song is 'Smile' sung by Nakasehina. Haida Mikage provides the vocals for Caroline's ending theme, 'Spring Snow'. Two discs for Prism Rhythm's original soundtrack have been produced.

Reception
On Getchu, Prism Rhythm was ranked first with the highest sales in May, 2010. Then in the following month June, Prism Rhythm's ranking dropped to 26th place. Prism Rhythm came 8th in the sales ranking of the year 2010, whilst Hello, Good-bye came 6th. On PCpress, Prism Rhythm came 5th in the reservation ranking log of April, 2010.

References

External links
Official website 

2010 video games
Bishōjo games
Enterbrain manga
Eroge
Japan-exclusive video games
Manga based on video games
PlayStation Portable games
Romance video games
Shōnen manga
Video games developed in Japan
Visual novels
Windows games
Lump of Sugar games